Berry Street is an independent Community Service Organisation and Australian charity. Established in 1877, protecting and caring for children has been the common thread throughout their history. Berry Street’s vision is that all children have a good childhood, growing up feeling safe, nurtured and with hope for the future.

Berry Street provides a diverse range of services across metropolitan, regional and rural Victoria, Australia.  Among these are;

Community Programs— Berry Street  focus on community strengthening especially through working in financial inclusion and capacity building of communities.

Disability Services— Berry Street  offer youth outreach programs for young people who have an intellectual disability and challenging behaviour.

Education— Berry Street  run an independent school, with campuses in Noble Park, Shepparton,and Morwell, offer a range of education programs, are a Registered Training Organisation and work in mainstream schools.  Berry Street has also entered into a partnership with Hands On Learning Australia in Gippsland at Traralgon Secondary College in addition to providing a host of other education related services.

Family Services— Berry Street play a role in the delivery of a set of services for families suffering from issues and Berry Street provide support for families facing difficulties and provide contact services for parents who can’t manage safe access arrangements for their children.

Family Violence— Berry Street have two large family violence programs in the Northern Metro Melbourne region and Ballarat/Central Highland region. Berry Street are the lead family violence partners in the North East and Central Highlands Support and Safety Hubs (The Orange Door).

Home Based Care— Berry Street relies on volunteer accredited foster carers to help children and young people recover from the trauma of family violence, child abuse and neglect. Carers are supported by Berry Street  staff, who work closely with the children and families.

Residential Care—trained and caring staff live with and look after up to 4 young people in our houses across Victoria, supporting children whose traumatic childhood experiences mean they are unable to live with their families. Berry Street have begun gaining accreditation in the Teaching Family Model and are the first Australian organisation to move towards this type of residential care.

Therapeutic Services—Berry Street argues that care alone is not enough to help children and young people recover from traumas they experienced. Counselling programs aim to work intensively with children and their caring network to help them understand their pain and learn to trust again.

Youth Services— Berry Street youth services include counselling, outreach, life skills, mentoring, accommodation and employment programs.

References

Children's charities based in Australia
Medical and health organisations based in Victoria (Australia)